Maury Schleicher (July 17, 1937 – April 15, 2004) was an American football defensive end and linebacker. He played for the Chicago Cardinals in 1959, the Los Angeles / San Diego Chargers from 1960 to 1962 and for the Toronto Argonauts in 1963.

References

1937 births
2004 deaths
American football defensive ends
American football linebackers
Penn State Nittany Lions football players
Chicago Cardinals players
Los Angeles Chargers players
San Diego Chargers players
Toronto Argonauts players